OzSpy is an Australian franchise chain specialising in electronic security. OzSpy has 10 stores throughout Australia, particularly in capital cities.

History
John Vlamis and Craig Mitchell founded the company in 1998, and began offering franchises in 2003.In 2007 OzSpy expanded to New Zealand, but withdrew soon after primarily due to lack of sales and distribution issues. The group now has 10 stores. The franchise administration office and warehouse is located on Queensland's Gold Coast.

It was the first store in Australia to make available to the general public surveillance devices of the type previously used only by private investigators.

In 2018 OzSpy introduced the mobile franchise offer allowing more flexibility and giving people the opportunity to work from home.

In 2018 OzSpy split the online stores into two separate entities to properly cater for both sides of the business and the new mobile division.

OzSpy founder Craig Mitchell initially based the concept on Spy Shops commonly found in the United States, and adapted it to suit the Australian market.  By adding a full range of commercial security products and services that caters to the needs of business and industry they positioned stores and business model to meet the security needs of a nation experiencing an increase in crime.

Stores
OzSpy stores can be found in Queensland, Victoria, and Western Australia. The stores have a strong capital city emphasis with most outlets located in metropolitan areas. There are also mobile franchises that provide a low cost entry into the market.

References

I spy a booming business in keeping an eye on the watchers  The Age September 26, 2006
  Franchising 23 May 2011
Slacks Creek spy shop hosts open day  Courier Mail July 19, 2011
Security franchise slashes fees by $50k as industry struggles Startupsmart Monday, 17 October 2011
OzSpy relaunches website Retail-Biz  28 October 2011

Bikies sweeping for police bugs  
  Franchise 26 July 2012
Retail sales boost for OzSpy franchise chain   Franchising 13 Feb 2013
OzSpy adds online store for mobile customer  Franchising 10 February 2014
OzSpy’s flat pack store fit out here to stay  Franchising 18 Feb 2014
  Courier Mail October 2 2018

External links
 - Security

Security companies of Australia
Electronics companies established in 1998
Retail companies established in 1998
Companies based on the Gold Coast, Queensland
1998 establishments in Australia